This list of mammals of Syria is derived from IUCN Red Lists.
The following tags are used to highlight each species' conservation status:

Order: Artiodactyla (even-toed ungulates) 

The even-toed ungulates are ungulates whose weight is borne about equally by the third and fourth toes, rather than mostly or entirely by the third as in perissodactyls. There are about 220 artiodactyl species, including many that are of great economic importance to humans.
Family: Bovidae (cattle, antelope, sheep, goats)
Subfamily: Antilopinae
Genus: Gazella
Mountain gazelle, G. gazella 
Arabian sand gazelle, G. marica 
Goitered gazelle, G. subgutturosa 
Subfamily: Caprinae
Genus: Capra
Nubian ibex, C. nubiana  reintroduced
Family: Cervidae (deer)
Subfamily: Capreolinae
Genus: Capreolus
 Roe deer, C. capreolus

Order: Carnivora (carnivorans) 

There are over 260 species of carnivorans, the majority of which feed primarily on meat. They have a characteristic skull shape and dentition. 
Suborder: Feliformia
Family: Felidae (cats)
Subfamily: Felinae
Genus: Caracal
 Caracal, C. caracal 
Genus: Felis
Jungle cat, F. chaus 
African wildcat, F. lybica 
Asiatic wildcat, F. l. ornata
Sand cat, F. margarita 
Family: Herpestidae (mongooses)
Genus: Herpestes
Egyptian mongoose, H. ichneumon 
Family: Hyaenidae (hyaenas)
Genus: Hyaena
 Striped hyena, H. hyaena 
Suborder: Caniformia
Family: Canidae (dogs, foxes)
Genus: Canis
 Golden jackal, C. aureus 
 Gray wolf, C. lupus 
 Arabian wolf, C. l. arabs
Indian wolf, C. l. pallipes
Genus: Vulpes
 Rüppell's fox, V. rueppellii 
 Red fox, V. vulpes 
Family: Ursidae (bears)
Genus: Ursus
Brown bear, U. arctos 
 Syrian brown bear, U. a. syriacus
Family: Mustelidae (mustelids)
Genus: Lutra
 European otter, L. lutra 
Genus: Martes
 European pine marten, M. martes 
Genus: Meles
 Caucasian badger, M. canescens 
Genus: Mustela
 Least weasel, M. nivalis 
Genus: Vormela
Marbled polecat, V. peregusna 
Family: Phocidae (earless seals)
Genus: Monachus
Mediterranean monk seal, M. monachus  possibly extirpated

Order: Cetacea (whales) 

The order Cetacea includes whales, dolphins and porpoises. They are the mammals most fully adapted to aquatic life with a spindle-shaped nearly hairless body, protected by a thick layer of blubber, and forelimbs and tail modified to provide propulsion underwater.

Species listed below also includes species being recorded in Levantine Sea.
Suborder: Mysticeti
Family: Balaenopteridae
Genus: Balaenoptera
 Blue whale, Balaenoptera musculus EN (possible)
 Fin whale, Balaenoptera physalus EN
 Common minke whale, Balaenoptera acutorostrata LC 
Subfamily: Megapterinae
Genus: Megaptera
Humpback whale, M. novaeangliae 
Family: Balaenidae
Genus: Eubalaena
 North Atlantic right whale, Eubalaena glacialis CR possibly present
Suborder: Odontoceti
Family: Physeteridae
Genus: Physeter
 Sperm whale, Physeter macrocephalus VU
Family: Ziphidae
Genus: Ziphius
 Cuvier's beaked whale, Ziphius cavirostris LC
Genus: Mesoplodon
 Gervais' beaked whale, Ziphius cavirostris DD
Superfamily: Platanistoidea
Family: Delphinidae (marine dolphins)
Genus: Tursiops
 Common bottlenose dolphin, Tursiops truncatus LC
Genus: Steno
 Rough-toothed dolphin, S. bredanensis , presence uncertain
Genus: Stenella
 Striped dolphin, Stenella coeruleoalba DD
 Pantropical spotted dolphin, Stenella attenuata LR/cd (possible)
Genus: Sousa
 Sousa chinensis DD
Genus: Delphinus
 Short-beaked common dolphin, Delphinus delphis LC
Genus: Grampus
 Risso's dolphin, Grampus griseus LC
Genus: Orcinus
 Orca, Orcinus orca DD
Genus: Pseudorca
 False killer whale, Pseudorca crassidens DD
Genus: Globicephala
 Long-finned pilot whale, Globicephala melas DD

Order: Chiroptera (bats) 

The bats' most distinguishing feature is that their forelimbs are developed as wings, making them the only mammals capable of flight. Bat species account for about 20% of all mammals.
Family: Pteropodidae (flying foxes, Old World fruit bats)
Subfamily: Pteropodinae
Genus: Rousettus
 Egyptian fruit bat, R. aegyptiacus 
Family: Vespertilionidae
Subfamily: Myotinae
Genus: Myotis
Lesser mouse-eared bat, M. blythii 
Greater mouse-eared bat, M. myotis 
Subfamily: Vespertilioninae
Genus: Eptesicus
 Botta's serotine, Eptesicus bottae LC
Genus: Otonycteris
 Desert long-eared bat, Otonycteris hemprichii 
Genus: Pipistrellus
 Kuhl's pipistrelle, Pipistrellus kuhlii LC
Genus: Plecotus
 Grey long-eared bat, Plecotus austriacus 
Subfamily: Miniopterinae
Genus: Miniopterus
Common bent-wing bat, M. schreibersii 
Family: Rhinopomatidae
Genus: Rhinopoma
 Egyptian mouse-tailed bat, R. cystops 
Family: Rhinolophidae
Subfamily: Rhinolophinae
Genus: Rhinolophus
Blasius's horseshoe bat, R. blasii 
Mediterranean horseshoe bat, R. euryale 
Greater horseshoe bat, R. ferrumequinum

Order: Erinaceomorpha (hedgehogs and gymnures) 

The order Erinaceomorpha contains a single family, Erinaceidae, which comprise the hedgehogs and gymnures. The hedgehogs are easily recognised by their spines while gymnures look more like large rats.
Family: Erinaceidae (hedgehogs)
Subfamily: Erinaceinae
Genus: Erinaceus
 Southern white-breasted hedgehog, E. concolor 
Genus: Hemiechinus
 Long-eared hedgehog, H. auritus 
Genus: Paraechinus
 Desert hedgehog, P. aethiopicus

Order: Hyracoidea (hyraxes) 

The hyraxes are four species of fairly small, thickset, herbivorous mammals in the order Hyracoidea. About the size of a domestic cat, they are well-furred, with rounded bodies and a stumpy tail. They are native to Africa and the Middle East.
Family: Procaviidae (hyraxes)
Genus: Procavia
 Cape hyrax, P. capensis

Order: Lagomorpha (lagomorphs) 

The lagomorphs comprise two families, Leporidae (hares and rabbits), and Ochotonidae (pikas). Though they can resemble rodents, and were classified as a superfamily in that order until the early 20th century, they have since been considered a separate order. They differ from rodents in a number of physical characteristics, such as having four incisors in the upper jaw rather than two.
Family: Leporidae (rabbits, hares)
Genus: Lepus
Cape hare, L. capensis 
European hare, L. europaeus

Order: Rodentia (rodents) 

Rodents make up the largest order of mammals, with over 40% of mammalian species. They have two incisors in the upper and lower jaw which grow continually and must be kept short by gnawing.
Suborder: Sciurognathi
Family: Sciuridae (squirrels)
Subfamily: Sciurinae
Tribe: Sciurini
Genus: Sciurus
 Caucasian squirrel, S. anomalus LC
Subfamily: Xerinae
Tribe: Marmotini
Genus: Spermophilus
 Asia Minor ground squirrel, Spermophilus xanthoprymnus 
Family: Gliridae (dormice)
Subfamily: Leithiinae
Genus: Dryomys
 Forest dormouse, Dryomys nitedula 
Genus: Eliomys
 Asian garden dormouse, Eliomys melanurus LC
Family: Dipodidae (jerboas)
Subfamily: Allactaginae
Genus: Allactaga
 Euphrates jerboa, Allactaga euphratica 
Family: Spalacidae
Subfamily: Spalacinae
Genus: Nannospalax
 Palestine mole rat, Nannospalax ehrenbergi 
Family: Calomyscidae
Genus: Calomyscus
 Tsolov's mouse-like hamster, Calomyscus tsolovi 
Family: Cricetidae
Subfamily: Cricetinae
Genus: Mesocricetus
 Golden hamster, Mesocricetus auratus EN
 Turkish hamster, Mesocricetus brandti 
Subfamily: Arvicolinae
Genus: Chionomys
 Snow vole, Chionomys nivalis 
Genus: Microtus
 Günther's vole, Microtus guentheri 
 Persian vole, Microtus irani 
 Social vole, Microtus socialis 
Family: Muridae (mice, rats, voles, gerbils, hamsters, etc.)
Subfamily: Deomyinae
Genus: Acomys
 Cairo spiny mouse, Acomys cahirinus LC
Subfamily: Gerbillinae
Genus: Gerbillus
 Wagner's gerbil, Gerbillus dasyurus 
Genus: Meriones
 Sundevall's jird, Meriones crassus LC
 Libyan jird, Meriones libycus LC
 Tristram's jird, Meriones tristrami 
 Vinogradov's jird, Meriones vinogradovi 
Genus: Psammomys
 Sand rat, Psammomys obesus LC
Genus: Tatera
 Indian gerbil, Tatera indica 
Subfamily: Murinae
Genus: Apodemus
 Yellow-necked mouse, Apodemus flavicollis 
Genus: Mus
 Macedonian mouse, Mus macedonicus 
Genus: Nesokia
 Short-tailed bandicoot rat, Nesokia indica LC

Order: Soricomorpha (shrews, moles, and solenodons) 

The "shrew-forms" are insectivorous mammals. The shrews and solenodons closely resemble mice while the moles are stout-bodied burrowers.
Family: Soricidae (shrews)
Subfamily: Crocidurinae
Genus: Crocidura
Lesser white-toothed shrew, C. suaveolens

Locally extinct 
The following species are locally extinct in the country: 
 Cheetah, Acinonyx jubatus
 Wild goat, Capra aegagrus
 Red deer, Cervus elaphus
 Persian fallow deer, Dama mesopotamica
 Onager, Equus hemionus
 Arabian oryx, Oryx leucoryx
 Lion, Panthera leo
 Leopard, Panthera pardus
Tiger, Panthera tigris

See also
Wildlife of Syria
List of chordate orders
Lists of mammals by region
Mammal classification

References

External links

'
mammals
Syria
Syria
'
'